Svoboda is a common Czech surname. Svobodová is a feminine form of the surname. For more than century it is one of the three most common Czech surnames.

Etymology
The primary meaning of the word is 'freedom' or 'liberty' in Czech. As a surname, it used to refer to "free men" (to distinguish them from "serfs"). In the old Czech orthography the word was written as Swoboda and this spelling is still preserved in countries where the letter "w" is common, such as Poland or German-speaking countries. The Slovak, Croatian and Serbian version is written as "Sloboda".

People named Svoboda
 Adam Svoboda (1978–2019), a Czech ice hockey goaltender
 Alena Svobodová, Czech rower
 Antonin Svoboda (disambiguation), multiple people
 Bill Svoboda (1928–1980), an American football linebacker
 Bohuslav Svoboda, Czech politician, mayor of Prague
 Cyril Svoboda (born 1956), former Deputy Prime Minister of the Czech Republic
 David Svoboda, Czech modern pentathlete
 František Svoboda (1906–1948), a Czech football player
 František Svoboda (canoeist) (born 1904), a Czechoslovak canoeist
 Gabriela Svobodová (born 1953), a former Czech cross country skier
 Hana Svobodová, beauty competition winner
 Irena Svobodová, Czech volleyball player
 J. Steven Svoboda, a patent lawyer
 Jakub Svoboda, Czech ice hockey player
 Jaroslav Svoboda (born 1980), Czech ice hockey right winger
 Jim Svoboda, American football coach
 Jiří Svoboda (canoeist) (born 1954), a Czechoslovak sprint canoeist
 Jiří Svoboda (volleyball) (born 1941), a Czech former volleyball player
 Jiřina Ptáčníková Svobodová, (born 1986), Czech female pole vaulter, wife of the Czech hurdler Petr Svoboda
 Jindřich Svoboda (footballer) (born 1952), a Czech football player
 Jindřich Svoboda (aviator) (1917–1942), a Czech bomber captain in the RAF
 Josef Svoboda (1920–2002), a Czech artist and scenic designer
 Karel Svoboda (disambiguation), multiple people
 Karl Svoboda (born 1962), Canadian former rugby union player
 Karl Svoboda (politician) (1929–2022), Austrian politician
 Kathy Svoboda, American biologist
 Květoslav Svoboda (born 1982), a Czech freestyle swimmer
 Ludvík Svoboda (1895–1979), a Czechoslovak general and politician
 Marcel Svoboda (born 1976), a Czech ski mountaineer
 Martin Svoboda (born 1975), Czech football goalkeeper
 Milan Svoboda, a Czechoslovak slalom canoeist
 Miroslav Svoboda (disambiguation), multiple people
 Oldřich Svoboda (born 1967), Czech ice hockey goalkeeper
 Patrik Svoboda (born 1994), Czech football player
 Pavel Svoboda (born 1962), a Czech politician and lawyer
 Pavel Svoboda (organist) (born 1987), a Czech Organist
 Petr Svoboda (born 1966), a retired Czech professional ice hockey defenseman
 Petr Svoboda (athlete) (born 1984), a Czech athlete, competing in the hurdle sprint
 Petr Svoboda (ice hockey b. 1980) (born 1980), a former professional ice hockey defenceman
 Radoslav Svoboda, Czech ice hockey player
 Růžena Svobodová (1868 — 1920), Czech writer
 Stanislav Svoboda, Czech cyclist
 Svatopluk Svoboda (1886–1971), a Czech gymnast
 Terese Svoboda, an American author from New York City
 Tomáš Svoboda (disambiguation), multiple people
 Zdeněk Svoboda (born 1972), a former professional footballer

See also

 
 Swoboda (disambiguation) for the Polish spelling
 Sloboda (disambiguation) for the Serbo-Croatian and Macedonian spelling
 List of most common surnames in the Czech Republic

References

Slavic-language surnames
Czech-language surnames